The Supreme People's Council was a political organization in the Prussian Partition of Poland, which played a major role during the Greater Poland Uprising (1918–19). It was established in 1916 in Poznań as an underground Interparty Committee (Komitet Międzypartyjny), also known as the Central Citizen's Committee (Centralny Komitet Obywatelski). After the World War I armistice, the committee renamed itself to the People's Council and later to the Supreme People's Council. The Council self-disbanded on August 19, 1919, when the power in the area was transferred to the re-united Second Polish Republic.

References

1916 establishments in Poland
Aftermath of World War I in Poland
Governments in Poland